The 1980 United States presidential straw poll in Guam was the first presidential straw poll held in Guam on November 4, 1980. Guam is a territory and not a state. Thus, it is ineligible to elect members of the Electoral College, who would then in turn cast direct electoral votes for president and for vice president. To draw attention to this fact, the territory conducts a non-binding presidential straw poll during the general election as if they did elect members to the Electoral College.

Democratic Party nominee and incumbent president Jimmy Carter won the poll with over 55% of the vote.

Results 
Though the votes of Guam citizens do not count in the November general election, the territory nonetheless conducts a presidential straw poll to gauge islanders' preference for president every election year. The poll has been held in Guam during every presidential election since 1980.

The voters had the option between four candidates, then Democratic incumbent president Jimmy Carter, Republican Ronald Reagan, former-Republican challenger to Ronald Reagan independent candidate John B. Anderson and libertarian candidate Edward Clark.

The election had 97.3% valid votes, with 2.7% of them being invalid. The votes overwhelmingly favored Jimmy Carter, with Ronald Reagan coming second.

See also 
 1980 United States presidential election
 1980 Democratic Party primaries
 1980 Republican Party primaries

References 

Guam
1980
1980s in Guam